

Ancient Egyptian roles 
 User (ancient Egyptian official), an ancient Egyptian nomarch (governor) of the Eighth Dynasty
 Useramen, an ancient Egyptian vizier also called "User"

Other uses 
 User (computing), a person (or software) using an information system
 User (telecommunications), an entity using a telecommunications system

See also 
 Drug user (disambiguation), a person who uses drugs
 End user, a user of a commercial product or service